Senecio glossanthus is an annual herb native to Australia. In Western Australia it is commonly known as slender groundsel.

Description
It is sparsely hairy, with few branches except for the branched inflorescence. The flowers are yellow.

Taxonomy
It was first published as Erechtites glossantha by Otto Wilhelm Sonder in 1853. In 1867, George Bentham transferred it into Senecio as S. brachyglossus, but this would later be considered an illegitimate name because it unnecessarily replaced Sonder's specific epithet. In 1956 Robert Orange Belcher effected a legitimate transfer by publishing the name Senecio glossanthus.

Distribution and habitat
It is widespread in temperate parts of the Australian mainland, occurring in every mainland state.

References

glossanthus
Asterales of Australia